Calvin Donovan Marlin (born 20 April 1976 in Port Elizabeth, Eastern Cape) is a retired South African football goalkeeper who works as a goalkeeping coach for Cape Town City.

He played club football for Michau Warriors, Seven Stars, Ajax Cape Town, SuperSport United, Mamelodi Sundowns and Mpumalanga Black Aces as well as representing South Africa internationally.

Marlin was a participant at the 2002 FIFA World Cup. He was South Africa's first choice keeper at the 2006 African Nations Cup in Egypt and has so far been capped 16 times.

He kicks left-footed but throws right-handed.
He is Ajax Cape Town coach from 2018

References

BBC Sport: 2002 World Cup

External links

1976 births
Living people
White South African people
South African soccer players
South Africa international soccer players
South African people of British descent
Association football goalkeepers
2002 FIFA World Cup players
2005 CONCACAF Gold Cup players
2006 Africa Cup of Nations players
Sportspeople from Port Elizabeth
Cape Town Spurs F.C. players
SuperSport United F.C. players
Mamelodi Sundowns F.C. players
Mpumalanga Black Aces F.C. players
Michau Warriors F.C. players
Ajax Cape Town F.C. managers
South African soccer managers
Soccer players from the Eastern Cape